Savapokhari  is a village development committee in Sankhuwasabha District in the Kosi Zone of north-eastern Nepal. At the time of the 1991 Nepal census it had a population of 2834 people living in 485 individual households. Shavapokhari village development committee contains 9 wards. The major attraction of this village development committee is Shavapokhari lake. This lake is situated at the height of around 3500 m from sea level. Generally people visit this area during the spring season. People more than ten thousand visit this place every year at Janai purnima.

References

External links
UN map of the municipalities of Sankhuwasabha District

Populated places in Sankhuwasabha District